Diving was contested at the 1958 Asian Games in Metropolitan Indoor Swimming Pool, Tokyo, Japan from 28 to 31 May 1954.

Medalists

Men

Women

Medal table

External links
Medals

 
1958 Asian Games events
1958
Asian Games
1958 Asian Games